MacDougall or MacDougal (see also McDougall) is a common Scottish surname that can refer to a number of individuals, or localities or things named for individuals with this surname. The name is an Anglicisation of the Scottish Gaelic Mac Dhùgaill, meaning "Son of Dougal".

It may refer to:

People

As surname
Adam MacDougall (born 1975) Australian rugby footballer 
Adam MacDougall (keyboardist) (born 1974) American keyboardist
Alan MacDougall Ritchie (1893–1964) World War II British Army officer
Alex MacDougall American record producer
Ben MacDougall (born 1977) Australian rugby footballer
Bon MacDougall (1901–1970) American racecar driver
Clinton D. MacDougall (1839–1914) United States Representative
Colin MacDougall (1834–1901) Canadian politician and lawyer
David Mercer MacDougall (born 1904–1991) Colonial Secretary of Hong Kong
Donald MacDougall (1912–2004) Scottish economist and civil servant
Duncan MacDougall, Donnchadh of Argyll (died 1240s), Scottish noble
Duncan MacDougall (doctor) (c 1866–1920)
Frank Archibald MacDougall (1896–1975) Canadian forest ranger
Hartland MacDougall (1875–1947) Canadian ice hockey player and stockbroker
Jack MacDougall (born 1853) Canadian politician
John MacDougall (disambiguation), several people
John MacDougall, Lord of Argyll (died 1316), Scottish nobleman and commander  
John Alexander Frances MacDougall (born 1974) Canadian politician
John MacDougall (UK politician) (1947–2008) Scottish Labor politician
John R. MacDougall (born c. 1961) aka Captain Midnight, American Engineer who jammed HBO's satellite signal
John Lorne MacDougall (1898–1956), Canadian Member of Parliament
Luke MacDougall (born 1982) Australian rugby footballer
Malcolm "Mal" MacDougall speechwriter
Norman MacDougall Scottish historian
Patrick Leonard MacDougall (1819–1894) British General and author
Ranald MacDougall (1915–1973) American screenwriter
Robert MacDougall (1875-unknown) Canadian ice hockey player
Roger MacDougall (1910–1993) Scottish playwright
Ruth Doan MacDougall American author
Shane MacDougall Canadian stand-up comedian
Ted MacDougall (born 1947) Scottish footballer
William MacDougall (born 1944) Canadian clergyman and politician

As given name
Alexander Macdougall Cooke (1899–1999) British doctor
John MacDougall Hay (1880–1919) Scottish novelist

Other
Clan MacDougall, a Scottish clan
MacDougall's, London Auction House

References

Anglicised Scottish Gaelic-language surnames
Surnames
Patronymic surnames
Surnames from given names